FAPA can refer to:
Fantasy Amateur Press Association
Fatty acid primary amide, a family of signalling compounds
The (United States) Federal Administrative Procedure Act
Fellow of the American Psychiatric Association
First Amendment Protected Activity
Formosan Association for Public Affairs
Florida Academy of Physician Assistants

Fellow of the American Psychiatric Association